Björn Svante Afzelius (27 January 1947 – 16 February 1999 ) was a Swedish singer-songwriter and guitar player. He was an outspoken socialist, known for his support for Olof Palme. His songs are about love, politics and joys and sadness in life.

Career
Björn Svante Afzelius was born on 27 January 1947 in Huskvarna, Jönköping County. His father Svante Arnold Afzelius (1923–1976) was an engineer and his mother Ulla Afzelius (1926–1971) was a housewife. His only sibling is his brother Bengt (b. 1952) who is a music teacher. He came into contact with music from a very young age, because his mother and her side of the family were largely into music. In 1970, Afzelius formed the progg group Hoola Bandoola Band together with Mikael Wiehe. Wiehe and Afzelius became very close friends and worked together long after Hoola Bandoola had dissolved in 1975.

Afzelius released his first solo album in 1974, his last one in 1999. Some of his most popular songs are "Ikaros", "Tusen bitar" (Thousand pieces – which was originally recorded by Danish Anne Linnet as "Tusind Stykker"), "Sång till friheten" (Song for Freedom – which was originally recorded by Cuban Silvio Rodríguez as "El Día Feliz Que Está Llegando"), "Kungens man" (The king's man), "Tankar i Havanna" (Thoughts in Havanna) and "Till min kära" (For my dear). He died from lung cancer in 1999, 52 years old, but he remains one of the most beloved artists in Scandinavia.

He wrote about 150 songs and sold over two-and-a-half million albums.

Death and legacy

Afzelius died on 16 February 1999 in Gothenburg.

The Björn Afzelius International Culture Foundation (BAIK) was set up in his honour. The foundation has in the past sponsored a prize known as the Freemuse Award, which recognises an individual or organisation that "has worked for freedom of musical expression in a remarkable way". Winners of the Freemuse Award include:
 2008: Tiken Jah Fakoly, Ivorian reggae singer exiled from Cote d'Ivoire owing to his outspokenness about political corruption
2009: Pete Seeger, American folk singer and activist
2010: Joint winners, Iranian singer Mahsa Vahdat and Turkish-Kurdish singer and activist Ferhat Tunç
2011: Ramy Essam, who provided the soundtrack for the Arab Spring at Tahrir Square, Cairo, Egypt
2013: Festival au Désert, founded and directed by Manny Ansar
2016: Lavon Volski, Belarusian rock musician
2017: Zohra, the first and only Afghan women’s orchestra

In 2021, the Freemuse Freedom of Artistic Expression Award was opened for nominations.

Discography

With Hoola Bandoola Band 
1971: Garanterat individuell
1972: Vem kan man lita på?
1973: 'På väg
1975: Fri Information
1975: "Stoppa matchen" (single)

Solo albums 
1974: Vem är det som är rädd?
1976: För kung och fosterland
1978: Johnny Boy (with Björn Afzelius Band)
1979: Bakom kulisserna (with Björn Afzelius Band)
1979: Another Tale to Tell (with Björn Afzelius Band) – Read the English lyrics Another Tale to Tell – lyrics
1980: Globetrotter (with Globetrotters)
1982: Innan tystnaden (with Globetrotters)
1982: Danska nätter (live) (with Globetrotters)
1984: Exil (with Globetrotters)
1984: Afzelius; sång & gitarr (live)
1985: Nio liv (with Globetrotters)
1986: Grande Finale (live) (with Globetrotters)
1986: Björn Afzelius & Mikael Wiehe (with Mikael Wiehe)
1987: Riddarna kring runda bordet
1988: Don Quixote
1988: En man, en röst, en gitarr
1990: Tusen bitar
1991: Nidaros (live)
1992: Afzelius, Bygren och Råstam (live)
1994: Nära dig
1997: Tankar vid 50
1999: Elsinore
2004: Björn Afzelius & Mikael Wiehe 1993 – Malmöinspelningarna (with Mikael Wiehe)
2011: Tusen bitar – Sånger om kärlek & rättvisa

Compilations 
1988: Björn Afzelius Bästa Vol I
1988: Björn Afzelius Bästa Vol II
1995: Björn Afzelius Bästa Vol III
1995: Afzelius Box (Bästa Vol 1, 2, 3)
1998: Den röda tråden – Definitivt
2002: Den röda tråden Vol 1
2002: Den röda tråden Vol 2
2005: Björn Afzelius Bästa
2006: Guldkorn vol.1

References

External links

Björn Afzelius official website 
 
 

1947 births
1999 deaths
People from Jönköping Municipality
Swedish songwriters
Swedish socialists
20th-century Swedish male singers
Deaths from lung cancer in Sweden